Fedamore GAA club is a Gaelic Athletic Association club in Fedamore, County Limerick, Ireland. The club fields teams in both hurling and Gaelic football. The club has won the Limerick Senior Hurling Championship on two occasions in 1912 and 1927.

Location
The club is located in the parish of Fedamore which is 15km south of Limerick City. It is a member of the East division and neighbouring clubs include Ballybricken/Bohermore, Camogue Rovers, Crecora/Manister and South Liberties with whom Fedamore once had a close rivalry.

History
The club was founded in 1884 making it one of the oldest GAA clubs in the county. The club won the Limerick Senior Hurling Championship in 1912 beating Ballingarry and in 1927 beating Young Ireland's. Several East Senior Championships were also won in the early 20th century. A great honour was achieved by the club when Liam Clifford was elected Ninth president of the GAA (1926-1928). Paddy Clohessy won All-Ireland Senior Hurling Championships in 1934, 1936 and 1940 while his brother Dave joined him in 1934 and 1936. The club's success then faded and they had to wait until 1976 for their next significant achievement when they won the County Intermediate Hurling Championship with a win over Glenroe. Soon after their minors amalgamated with South Liberties and reached the county final

Fedamore struggled at underage and also at senior over the next few years. Despite this they remained senior until the early 1990s. Throughout the 2000s the club's adult side made little impact at junior level and they were also forced to field 13-a-side and 11-a-side teams at underage with little success. The club did win the County Under-16 11-a-side championship in 2010 but declining numbers meant that they are amalgamated with Crecora/Manister from under-13 to minor (Kilpeacon) and with South Liberties at under-21 level (St. Kevin's). Kilpeacon won the County Minor B Football Championship in 2013. Fedamore's junior B footballers won the County Junior B Football League also in 2013 but were beaten narrowly in the Championship final by Feenagh/Kilmeedy. In 2015 Fedamore won the Junior B football county championship (first adult county title in 39 years) beating close rivals Crecora in the final.

Grounds
The club's field used to be located in Fanningstown, 2km from the village but a site was bought at Boolavoord just outside the village on the Croom road. The facilities include a full sized pitch, clubhouse and car park

Honours
 Limerick Senior Hurling Championship (2): 1912, 1927
 Limerick Intermediate Hurling Championship (1): 1976
 Limerick Junior 'B' Football Championship (1): 2015

Notable players
 Willie Gleeson
 Paddy Clohessy
 Dave Clohessy
 Tom Shinney

External links
Fedamore GAA site

Gaelic games clubs in County Limerick
Hurling clubs in County Limerick
Gaelic football clubs in County Limerick